George Washington Carver at Tuskegee Institute is a film taken by African-American Allen Alexander. The film, which depicts George Washington Carver in his apartment, his place of work, and his garden, was taken on color Kodachrome film. The films are held by the National Film Registry as a film that is  "cultural, historic and aesthetic importance to the nation's film heritage". According to the National Archives of the United States, the video used in the film was likely captured in either 1941 or 1942.

References 

George Washington Carver